Oula Palve (born 19 February 1992) is a Finnish professional ice hockey forward currently playing for Brynäs IF in the Swedish Hockey League (SHL).

Playing career
Undrafted, Palve made his SM-liiga debut playing with JYP Jyväskylä during the 2012–13 SM-liiga season.

In the 2018–19 season, Palve established a new career bests in the Liiga with 16 goals and 51 points in 53 games for TPS.

On 22 April 2019, Palve signed a one-year, entry-level contract with the Pittsburgh Penguins of the NHL. The deal will carry an NHL salary of $700K (the league minimum) as well as a maximum $92.5K signing bonus and games played incentives of up to $132.5K.

After attending his first training camp with the Penguins, Palve was assigned to begin the 2019–20 season in the AHL with affiliate, the Wilkes-Barre/Scranton Penguins. Palve struggled to find his offensive game with Wilkes-Barre, posting just 1 goal and 8 points in 37 games. On 17 January 2020, Palve was traded mid-season by the Penguins to the Dallas Stars in exchange for John Nyberg.  He was assigned to the Stars' AHL affiliate and namesake, the Texas Stars, for the remainder of the season.

With his lone season in North America complete due to the cancellation of the season with COVID-19, Palve opted to return to Europe in agreeing to a two-year contract with Swedish club, Linköping HC of the SHL, on 28 April 2020.

Personal life
In 2021, Palve became engaged to former The Bachelor contestant Haley Ferguson. They married on June 11, 2022 .

Career statistics

Awards and honours

References

External links

1992 births
Living people
Brynäs IF players
Finnish ice hockey centres
HPK players
JYP-Akatemia players
JYP Jyväskylä players
People from Keuruu
Linköping HC players
Mikkelin Jukurit players
Texas Stars players
HC TPS players
Wilkes-Barre/Scranton Penguins players
Sportspeople from Central Finland